Manassas, formerly the U.S. Revenue Cutter Afinot, was seized by the Confederates at New Bern, North Carolina, on 27 August 1861. With the launches Mosquito and Sand Fly, she was placed under Lt. W. H. Murdaugh, CSN, who was seriously wounded in the Federal attack on Fort Hatteras the next day, and was unable to assume his command. Manassas was active on the coast of North Carolina during 1861-62 and then dismantled by the Confederates.

References 

Ships of the Confederate States Navy